Llong may refer to:

Llong, Flintshire, Wales
Llong railway station, a closed station in Wales

Nigel Llong (born 1969), an English cricket umpire and former first-class cricketer